Holyoke is the home rule municipality that is the county seat and the most populous municipality of Phillips County, Colorado, United States.  The city population was 2,346 at the 2020 United States Census.

History
The city is named after Holyoke, Massachusetts, which is itself named for Elizur Holyoke, an explorer in the 17th-century.

Geography

Holyoke is located at  (40.582002, -102.301056).

At the 2020 United States Census, the town had a total area of  including  of water.

Climate
According to the Köppen Climate Classification system, Holyoke has a cold semi-arid climate, abbreviated "BSk" on climate maps.

Demographics

As of the census of 2000, there were 2,261 people, 896 households, and 594 families residing in the city. The racial makeup of the city was 89.61% White, 0.04% African American, 0.31% Native American, 0.57% Asian, 8.09% from other races, and 1.37% from two or more races. Hispanic or Latino of any race were 20.39% of the population.

There were 896 households, out of which 34.4% had children under the age of 18 living with them, 57.9% were married couples living together, 6.3% had a female householder with no husband present, and 33.7% were non-families. 30.6% of all households were made up of individuals, and 16.0% had someone living alone who was 65 years of age or older.  The average household size was 2.47 and the average family size was 3.11.

In the city, the population was spread out, with 28.3% under the age of 18, 6.4% from 18 to 24, 26.6% from 25 to 44, 20.1% from 45 to 64, and 18.7% who were 65 years of age or older.  The median age was 38 years. For every 100 females, there were 90.2 males.  For every 100 females age 18 and over, there were 86.7 males.

The median income for a household in the city was $30,984, and the median income for a family was $36,970. Males had a median income of $30,500 versus $17,455 for females. The per capita income for the city was $15,697.  About 12.0% of families and 14.6% of the population were below the poverty line, including 21.1% of those under age 18 and 8.4% of those age 65 or over.

Notable residents
Greg Brophy (b. 1966), former state senator
Bill Brundige (1948–2018), American football defensive end
Mike Groene (b. 1955), politician
Dorothy Horrell (b. 1951), Chancellor of University of Colorado Denver
Charles B. Timberlake (1854–1941), U.S. Congressman from Colorado

See also

Colorado
Bibliography of Colorado
Index of Colorado-related articles
Outline of Colorado
List of counties in Colorado
List of municipalities in Colorado
List of places in Colorado
 Patricia (Pat) Hepinstall, one of the first women to fly to Antarctica
 W. E. Heginbotham House

References

External links

City of Holyoke website
CDOT map of the City of Holyoke

Cities in Phillips County, Colorado
Cities in Colorado
County seats in Colorado